Ver Sacrum (meaning "Sacred Spring" in Latin) was the official magazine of the Vienna Secession. Founded by Gustav Klimt and Max Kurzweil, it was published from 1898 to 1903, featuring drawings and designs in the Secession style along with literary contributions from distinguished writers from across Europe. These included Rainer Maria Rilke, Hugo von Hofmannsthal, Maurice Maeterlinck, Knut Hamsun, Otto Julius Bierbaum, Richard Dehmel, Ricarda Huch, Conrad Ferdinand Meyer, Josef Maria Auchentaller and Arno Holz.

See also
 List of magazines in Austria

References

External links

 
 Digitized issues of Ver Sacrum on the website of the University of Heidelberg
 E-Books of Ver Sacrum on the website of the Belvedere Museum

Art Nouveau magazines
Defunct magazines published in Austria
German-language magazines
Magazines established in 1898
Magazines disestablished in 1903
Magazines published in Vienna
Vienna Secession
1898 establishments in Austria
1903 disestablishments in Austria